Thuận Thiên (Heaven's will) may refer to:

 Era name of Lý Thái Tổ from 1010 to 1028
 Empress Consort Thuận Thiên of Trần Thái Tông
 The mythical sword Thuận Thiên of Lê Thái Tổ
 Era name of Lê Thái Tổ from 1428 to 1433
 Imperial Consort Thuận Thiên of Gia Long

See also
 Shuntian (disambiguation) (era names and placenames of China)
Suncheon (a city in South Korea)